HB2 is the debut EP by haloblack, self-released on February 10, 1992. The album comprises a collection of demos that were recorded in 1992 with the intention of being part of the band's debut Tension Filter.

Reception
CAKE Music gave HB2 a positive review and said haloblack's "beatbox and bass, with buzzsaw melodies and dissonant droning vocals become an emotional biopsy drill for your average, sensitive, new-age guy." Industrialnation awarded the release five out of five possible stars and made note of the energetic performances.

Track listing

Personnel
Adapted from the HB2 liner notes.

haloblack
 Bryan Barton (as Bryan Black) – vocals, instruments, production, engineering

Production and design
 Carl White – production, engineering

Release history

References

External links 
 
 HB2 at Bandcamp
 

1992 debut EPs
haloblack albums